2-Ethyl-5-methoxy-N,N-dimethyltryptamine (EMDT) is a tryptamine derivative which is used in scientific research. It acts as a selective 5-HT6 receptor agonist, with a Ki of 16 nM, and was one of the first selective agonists developed for this receptor. EMDT inhibits both short- and long-term memory formation in animal studies, and this effect can be reversed by the selective 5-HT6 antagonist SB-399,885. Additionally, it is active in the tail suspension test, suggesting that it could be an effective antidepressant.

See also 
 EMD-386,088
 ST-1936

References 

5-HT6 agonists
Tryptamines
Phenol ethers
Dimethylamino compounds
Methoxy compounds